John Coventre (fl. 1412–1440) of Wycombe, Buckinghamshire, was an English Member of Parliament for Chipping Wycombe in November 1414, 1419, 1422, 1423 and 1427.

References

14th-century births
1440s deaths
English MPs November 1414
English MPs 1419
English MPs 1422
English MPs 1423
English MPs 1427
15th-century English politicians
People from High Wycombe